Emanuel Lundström (20 September 1896 – 4 April 1961) was a Swedish long-distance runner. He competed in the men's 5000 metres at the 1920 Summer Olympics.

References

1896 births
1961 deaths
Athletes (track and field) at the 1920 Summer Olympics
Swedish male long-distance runners
Olympic athletes of Sweden
Place of birth missing